Charles Person (born 1942) is an African-American civil rights activist who participated in the 1961 Freedom Rides. He was born and raised in Atlanta, Georgia. Following his 1960 graduation from David Tobias Howard High School, he attended Morehouse College. Person was the youngest Freedom Rider on the original Congress of Racial Equality Freedom Ride.  His memoir Buses Are a Comin': Memoir of a Freedom Rider was published by St. Martin's Press in 2021.

Life Before the Freedom Rides
Person was born in Atlanta on September 27, 1942. His father was an orderly at Emory University Hospital. He was a gifted math and physics student, with aspirations to become a scientist. In high school, he was a member of his local NAACP Youth Council. In the Fall of 1960, he enrolled as a freshman at Morehouse College. As a Freshman at Morehouse, he became active in the civil rights movement, joining a student organization called the Atlanta Committee on Appeal for Human Rights. Person received his first jail sentence, a sixteen-day trip, after a sit-in in 1961. In an interview, Person had this to say about the sit-ins: "Once I got involved, it was infectious, anything that had to do with protests, I was there. My life revolved around it, I did my homework and my assignment around sitting-in. You’d be surprised how good study habits you can develop, because you were just sitting at a lunch counter with no place to go, they weren’t going to feed us, so you just sat there and did your studies." They were attacked with items such as condiments and cigarette butts, and threatened with items like meat cleavers. The students in these sit-ins practiced non-violent tactics, which helped make the threats and attacks less interesting for the whites trying to intimidate them. He gained the attention of CORE recruiters that were looking for an Atlanta freedom rider. As a minor, he needed a parent signature to participate. His mother refused to sign, but he was able to convince his father.

The Freedom Rides
Person was a member of the original 13 freedom riders departing from Washington, D.C. aboard a Trailways bus on May 4, 1961. His first encounter with the law came in Charlotte, North Carolina. At the Charlotte bus station, Person thought his shoes were dirty, so he decided to get a shoe shine. He decided to stay in the whites only shoe-shine station until either his shoes were shined or he was arrested. A policeman arrived shortly, and Person decided he would leave the chair to avoid arrest.

The most troubling encounter for Person occurred in Alabama. As the Trailways bus was leaving Atlanta it was boarded by a group of white Klansmen. As the bus departed, the Klansmen began making threats, such as "You niggers will be taken care of when you get in Alabama." After arriving in Anniston, Alabama hours after the Greyhound bus burning of another Freedom Ride bus, the Klansmen became violent. After the black riders refused to move to the back, one Klansman rushed Person, punching him in the face. Another Klansman struck Herman Harris, who was sitting next to Person.  The Klansmen dragged a severely beaten Person and Harris to the back of the bus. The bus driver, who had left the bus some time during the fight, returned with a police officer. The officer did nothing to help the riders. The bus then continued on to Birmingham, Alabama.

In Birmingham, Person and fellow freedom rider James Peck were designated to test the segregationist policies at the station. Peck recalls "When we arrived in… Birmingham, we saw along the sidewalk about twenty men with pipes, we saw no cop in sight. And now I'll tell you what, how I remember the date. The next day, Bull Connor, the notorious police chief was asked why there were no police on hand. He said, he replied, it was Mother's Day and they were all visiting their mothers. Well, we got out of the bus and Charles Person, the black student from Atlanta and I, had been designated to try to enter the lunch counter. So of course we didn't there. This mob seized us and uh… well part of it seized me and the other seized Person, and I was unconscious, I'd say, within a minute." Person was attacked by a man with a lead pipe when Person and Peck attempted to use a whites only lunch counter. Person was able to escape and find his way to Fred Shuttlesworth's parsonage. He did not fight back. Person "chose nonviolence as a way of life."

References

Notes

Sources

1943 births
Living people
American civil rights activists
Freedom Riders